Reform is beneficial change

Reform may also refer to:

Media
Reform (album), a 2011 album by Jane Zhang
Reform (band), a Swedish jazz fusion group
Reform (magazine), a Christian magazine
Reforme ("Reforms"), initial name of the Aromanian newspaper Românul de la Pind

Places
Reform, Alabama
Reform, Mississippi
Reform, Missouri

Religion
Reform (religion), the process of reforming teachings within a religious community
Reform (Anglican), an evangelical organisation within Anglicanism
Reform Judaism, a denomination of Judaism
Reformed tradition or Calvinism, a Protestant branch of Christianity

Other
Reform (horse) (1964–1983), a Thoroughbred racehorse
Reform (think tank), a British think tank
Reform Act, a series of 19th- and 20th-century UK voting reforms
Reform Club (disambiguation)
Reform Movement (disambiguation)
Reform Party (disambiguation)

See also
Catalytic reforming, a chemical process in oil refining
La Reforma or The Liberal Reform, a period in 19th-century Mexico when the modern nation state was born
La Réforme, Reform, a 19th-century French newspaper, based in Paris
Non-reformist reform, a term identifying reforms which are transformative
The Reform Institute
Reforma (newspaper), Mexican newspaper
Reformation (disambiguation)
Reformasi (disambiguation)
"Reformed" (Steven Universe), an episode of Steven Universe
Reformer (disambiguation)
Reforming Movement, a French centrist political group created in 1972
Reformism
Steam reforming, catalytic oxidation to produce hydrogen from hydrocarbons
Wesleyan Reform Union, an independent group of Methodists in the United Kingdom

es:Reforma
pt:Reforma